Aromobates meridensis (common name: Mérida rocket frog) is a species of frog in the family Aromobatidae. It is endemic to the Cordillera de Mérida near Chorotal, Venezuela.

Description
Aromobates meridensis measure  in snout–vent length and have basal toe webbing. The male protects the eggs that are laid on land. After hatching, the male carries the tadpoles on his back to water where they develop further.

Habitat and conservation
The natural habitats of Aromobates meridensis are streams in cloud forest. This species is threatened by habitat loss. Also the invasive bullfrog Lithobates catesbeianus is a threat.

References

meridensis
Amphibians of Venezuela
Endemic fauna of Venezuela
Taxonomy articles created by Polbot
Amphibians described in 1972